Cladopelma is a genus of non-biting midges in the subfamily Chironominae and tribe Chironomini of the bloodworm family Chironomidae. Species are distributed world-wide (Cranston et al. 1989, Yan et al. 2008), with species represented in the Palaearctic, Nearctic, Neotropical, Afrotropical, Sino-Indian, and Austroasian regions.

Species
Cladopelma amachaerus (Townes, 1945)
Cladopelma bicarinatum (Brundin, 1947)
Cladopelma collator (Townes, 1945)
Cladopelma costum Yan et al. 2008
Cladopelma curtivalve (Kieffer, 1917)
Cladopelma edwardsi (Kruseman, 1933)
Cladopelma forcipes (Rempel, 1939)
Cladopelma galeator (Townes, 1945)
Cladopelma goetghebueri Spies et Sæther 2004
Cladopelma inflexum (Freeman, 1957)
Cladopelma krusemani (Goetghebuer, 1935)
Cladopelma laccophila(Kieffer, 1922)
Cladopelma spectabilis (Townes, 1945)
Cladopelma subnigrum (Brundin, 1947)
Cladopelma virescens (Meigen, 1818) type species, by designation of Harnisch (1923)
Cladopelma viridulum (Linnaeus, 1767)

References
 Cranston P.S., M.E. Dillon, L.C.V. Pinder and F. Reiss. 1989. The adult males of Chironominae (Diptera: Chironomidae) of the Holarctic region - keys and diagnoses, p. 353-502 in Wiederholm, T. (Ed.), Chironomidae of the Holarctic region. Keys and diagnoses. Part 3 Adult males. Entomologica Scandinavica (suppl.) 34: 1–532.
 Yan C., Z. Jin, and X. Wang. 2008. Cladopelma Kieffer from the Sino-Indian Region (Diptera: Chironomidae). Zootaxa 1916: 44–56.

Chironomidae
Nematocera genera